The Adabrock Hoard is a collection of Late Bronze Age artefacts deposited at Adabroc, Isle of Lewis, Scotland around 1000-800 BC. The artefacts comprise two bronze socketed axeheads, a spearhead, a gouge, a hammer, three razors, as well as fragments of decorated bronze vessel, two whetstones and beads of glass, amber and gold. The hoard was discovered in peat, at a depth of 9-10 feet, by Donald Murray in May 1910.  The hoard was acquired shortly after discovery by the National Museum of Antiquities of Scotland (now National Museums Scotland) and is accessioned as X.DQ 211-227.

Discovery 

The Adabrock Hoard was discovered by Donald Murray while cutting peat for fuel  in May 1910. The hoard was excavated by the finder, who described the artefacts as being 'all in one group, the smaller things above and the heavier below'.

Reference

External links section 
 Canmore link 
Archaeology of Scotland
Archaeological artifacts